The Christmas Hope is a 2009 American-Canadian made-for-television drama film directed by Norma Bailey and starring Madeleine Stowe which was broadcast on Lifetime on December 13, 2009. It is the third part in a trilogy of films, preceded by The Christmas Shoes (2002) and The Christmas Blessing (2005).

Plot
After the recent loss of her son Sean—a minor character in The Christmas Blessing—Patty Addison (Madeleine Stowe) devotes herself to finding homes for needy children. The loss of Sean has strained Patty's relationship with her husband Mark, an airline pilot. But they reconnect emotionally when they take in Emily, a 9-year-old orphaned in a car accident similar to the one that killed Sean.

At the same time Dr. Nathan Andrews—the one character that connects the entire film trilogy—is trying to find the parents of a boy who died in the ER, and Mark is trying to help one of his son's friends. By the end of the film, all three stories are intertwined as they all look for Emily, who has run away.

Cast

See also
 List of Christmas films

References

External links
 
 The Christmas Hope at Lifetime's website

2009 television films
2009 films
2009 romantic drama films
American romantic drama films
American Christmas drama films
Canadian Christmas drama films
Canadian drama television films
English-language Canadian films
Christmas television films
Television sequel films
Lifetime (TV network) films
Films directed by Norma Bailey
2000s Christmas drama films
2000s American films
2000s Canadian films